The history of the Arkansas State Guard and the Spanish–American War begins with the reorganization of the state militia following the end of Reconstruction. In 1879 the Arkansas Legislature had abolished the office of Adjutant General in retaliation for the use of the state militia to interfere in local political matters during reconstruction. During this period the Governor's Private Secretary performed the duties of the Adjutant General as an additional duty, and the legislature provided no appropriated funds for the state guard. Several companies existed during this period, including the Quapaw Guards and the McCarthy Guard in Little Rock. In 1897 the Arkansas State Guard was reorganized to consist of four infantry regiments, two artillery batteries and a cavalry squadron. In 1897, the state provided two volunteer infantry regiments for the Spanish–American War and although these two Arkansas Volunteer Infantry Regiments were not deployed overseas and did not see actual combat, they did suffer a number of casualties from disease.

Post Reconstruction
Interest in the state militia waned following Reconstruction. Officially the state militia consisted of two regiments of infantry, one battery of artillery, one troop cavalry, and one signal unit.  The Regimental headquarters of the 1st Infantry, Arkansas State Guards was located in Little Rock, but with little or no state funding, the militia units that existed were supported with private funds. Local militia companies participated in drill and ceremony competitions, with all the funding for travel, uniforms and equipment coming from private sources.

The Capital City Guards were organized in Little Rock in 1880. This company and the Quapaw Guards escorted Governor Churchill to his inauguration on January 13, 1881.

The Cherokee Guards were an African American company organized in Little Rock in 1881.

The Eagle Guards were organized in Lonoke County, in 1884.

The Faulkner Guards were organized in Faulkner County, in 1884.

The Garland Greys were a militia company organized in Jefferson County and commanded by Captain Sam Hilzheim. In 1881, Hilzheim was ordered to muster black troops into a new company to be called the Neel Guards. However, Hilzheim refused to enroll black troops, and Governor Churchill had him court-martialed. Hilzheim was convicted and sentenced to be suspended from his rank for six months. Governor Churchill revoked the suspension when Captain Hilzheim agreed to obey his orders. The Neel Guards were then mustered into state service in June 1881 The Garland Grey's disbanded following Hilzheim's conviction.

The Hallies Guards were organized in Little Rock in 1880.

The Hot Springs Guards were organized in Hot Springs, Garland County, in 1884.  The unit participated in drill competitions with the Quapaw Guard in the summer 1884.

The McCarthy Light Guards were organized in Little Rock in 1887, named for John H. McCarthy, the local business man who paid for their uniforms. The company competed in several drill competitions, including the Interstate Competitive Drill at Galveston, Texas, where the  placed third, at Atlanta in 1889 where they were second, in Omaha in 1891 where again were second, and finally at Nashville, Tennessee, where they won first place. The company was invited to attend the Chicago Worlds Far in 1893, and took fourth prize at the Interstate Competitive Drill in its home town of Little Rock in 1894. In 1894 the unit was mobilized to help control with a railroad worker's strike.

The all black Neel Guards were organized in Jefferson County in 1881.  A Captain Sam Helzheim was ordered to muster African American volunteers into this company.  When Helzheim refused to enroll black men, Governor Churchill had Helzeim court martialed. He was convicted and sentenced to be suspended from his office for six months. Governor Churchill revoked the suspension Helzheim mustered the Neel Guards were mustered into state service in June 1881

The Quapaw Guard was organized in Little Rock in 1880. This company and the Capital City Guards escorted Governor Churchill to his inauguration on January 13, 1881.  The unit was deployed to Perry County in the summer of 1881 for three weeks to deal with a general spirit of lawlessness, reported by the county judge. The unit won drill competitions at the state fair against units from Memphis and St. Louis. The unit's armory was located in Little Rock at the corner of Markham and Chester Streets.

Reorganization of 1891
In 1891, Captain E. D. Thomas, a captain of the 5th Cavalry was ordered to make an inspection of Arkansas State Guard on behalf of the Inspector General of the Army. Upon reaching Little Rock, Captain Thomas found that the only military organizations in existence at that time in the state were at the local level.  Captain Thomas indicated that regimental and brigade level organizations had not been maintained in several years.  Thomas indicated that the existing local companies were supported through "benevolence and that the state had not even applied to utilize funds for the support of the militia which had recently been approved of by Congress.  Captain Thomas' visit apparently spurred the state into action because he indicated that the following order had been issued prior to his departure from Little Rock:

The following regimental officers were appointed by Adjutant General Files:

 Colonel John D. Waldron, Commander of the First Regiment Arkansas State Guard, effective October 1, 1891.
 Lieutenant Colonel John M. Dungan
 Major G. C. Schogg
 Captain  C. M. Wing appointed as the Regimental Adjutant
 Captain Chas. E. Taylor appointed as the Regimental Quartermaster

Col. Waldron was ordered to take necessary steps to completely organize and equip his regiment, making all necessary appointments of non-commissioned officers.  He was authorized to make such visits and inspections as he deemed proper in the performance of his duty.

First encampment
In the winter of 1892 the Arkansas State Guard conducted its first annual encampment. An encampment was also conducted in the summer of 1893 at Hot Springs. The favorable publicity for these militia encampments led to efforts to improve the organization of the Guard probably resulting in the organization of new military companies:

The Morrison Rifles were organized in Newport Arkansas on August 30, 1892.  The company received its financial support from a committee of local businessmen, including Lancelot Minor, a Newport attorney and civic leader.  However, the organization failed to complete the state military requirements, and its officers were never commissioned.

The Newport militia company was reorganized May 8, 1893, as the Hurley Rifles, in honor of Captain G. W. Hurley, a veteran of the Mexican War, and the pioneer citizen of Newport. Eugene B. Douglass, for many years an officer of tue Chickasaw Guards, a militia company in Memphis Tennessee was elected Captain. The company met every Monday
evening for drill. This company eventually became Company F, 2nd Regiment, Arkansas State Guards. The company officers were:

Eugene B. Douglass, Captain
George A. Hilihouse, First Lieutenant
Rush H. Davis, Second Lieutenant
Charles L. Minor, Third Lieutenant
Sam R. Phillips, Fourth Lieutenant
Adam Bach, Quartermaster

2nd Regiment, Arkansas State Guards, is formed
Brigadier General George Presley Taylor, of Forrest City, was appointed commander of the Arkansas State Guard in 1894. As Arkansas State Guard grew in number of companies, and plans were made to divide the state into two regiments shortly after the summer encampment of 1893. The division was not made until January 16, 1894. The dividing line was the thirty-fifth parallel of latitude. The 1st Regiment, Arkansas State Guards, command by Col. F. B. T. Hohenburg, comprised the southern part of the state and a new 2nd Regiment, ASG was formed to include the norther part of the state. Companies in the 2nd Regiment (the northern division) were located at Van Buren, Magazine, Conway, Paragould, Marion, Newport, Fort Smith, Clarksville, Rector and Yellville.

Lancelot Minor, a Newport attorney who had been  active in support of the Newport militia company, was appointed Colonel of the 2nd Regiment, Arkansas State Guard. Lieutenant W. R. Samples of the United States Army was assigned to the Arkansas State Guard during the period of reorganization.  Lieutenant Samples wrote to Lancelot Minor, January 3, 1893:

Lieutenant Samples then wrote Governor William M. Fishback, on January 5, 1894:

On January 15, Lieutenant Samples wrote Col. Minor:

In discussing the appointment, the Arkansas Gazette described Col. Minor as 'one of the best fellows and best known lawyers in the State" On January 23, the Gazette reported: "Col. Minor, of Newport, detailed as Colonel of the Second Regiment of Arkansas State Guard, has assumed command and directs that all company commanders make out and forward to him at once a complete roster of their companies, stating time and place of drills." Colonel Minor appointed Lieutenant Rush H. Davis, of Company F, to serve as adjutant for the regiment, and John Frank Caldwell of Newport (and a Confederate veteran), was appointed regimental quartermaster with the rank of 2nd Lieutenant. On March 24, 1894, Rev. R. B. Willis, of Newport was named chaplain of the Second Regiment.  In May, 1894, Lieutenant George A. Hillhouse, of Newport, was appointed Major.

In early March, 1894 companies began receiving complete uniforms, blankets and Rifles.  Colonel Minor and his official staff were also supplied with appropriate uniforms, including a saber, belt and shoulder straps for the Colonel.

Legislature fails to support

The Arkansas Gazette reported on May 28, 1895:

Reorganization of 1897
In January 1897 Governor Daniel W. Jones took office and appointed Brigadier General Arthur Neill as his Private Secretary and Acting Adjutant General (the position of Adjutant General had still not been re-authorized by the state legislature at this time). The new Governor and Adjutant General began a massive re-organization of the Arkansas State Guard.  Two additional regiments of infantry, another troop of cavalry, and another battery of artillery were added to the organization.
The state was divided into two military districts, with the Arkansas River being the dividing line.  Major General Robert G. Shaver was commissioned and placed in overall command of the state's forces.  Brigadier General C. R. Shaer was commissioned and placed in command of the Southern District, which included the 1st and 2nd Infantry Regiments, two batteries of artillery and a signal company.  Major General V.Y. Cook was commissioned and placed in command of the Northern District, consisting of the 2nd and 4th Regiments of Infantry and a squadron of Cavalry. The units were poorly equipped and had outdated equipment.

Southern District, Brigadier General C.R. Schaer, Commanding

 

Artillery Batteries

Northern District, Major General V.Y. Cook, Commanding

The Spanish–American War

On April 25, 1898, President William McKinley called upon the state to supply two infantry regiments for the Spanish–American War. None of the regiments were in condition to deploy and only two companies were judged fit to be mustered into service immediately. The 1st, 2nd, 3rd, and 4th Regiments of Infantry, Arkansas State Guard, were reorganized and were mustered into federal service between May 14–25, 1898 at Little Rock as the 1st and 2nd Arkansas Volunteer Infantry for service in the Spanish–American War. Governor Jones intended that all sections of the Arkansas be represented as much as possible, so the two new regiments were created from selected State Guard companies from different sections of the state.
Pursuant to the Governor's direction the Regiments were organized as follows:

1st Arkansas Volunteer Infantry

2nd Arkansas Volunteer Infantry

The newly formed Arkansas Volunteer Infantry Regiments did not see combat during the Spanish–American War, due its brevity. In May 1898, the 1st Arkansas, commanded by Colonel Elias Chandler, along with the 2nd Arkansas, had moved to Camp George H. Thomas at Chickamauga Park, Georgia. Both regiments were still undergoing training there  when the war effectively ended with the fall of Cuba and the signing of an armistice in early August. The 1st Arkansas Volunteer Infantry mustered out of federal service on October 25, 1899, at Little Rock, Arkansas. However, the 2nd Regiment continued in service until February 25, 1899, when the men were finally mustered out at Anniston, Alabama. Even though the regiments saw no fighting, their deployment was not without fatalities. Fifty-four Arkansas Soldiers died of disease or in accidents during their mobilization.

Flags of the First Arkansas Infantry 
Three flags have survived that were made for the first Arkansas with the intent to use them for the war. Due to the conflict ending too quickly for the first Arkansas be involved in any fighting, the flags were never used in combat. The flags are currently in the possession of the Old State House Museum.

Relevance to current Arkansas National Guard
While the Arkansas State Guard did not win any additional campaign participation credit for its mobilization as a part of the Spanish–American War, the reorganization the occurred as a result of the war laid the ground work for the modern Arkansas National Guard.  The 153rd Infantry Regiment and the 142nd Field Artillery Regiment each trace their lineage and honors to the units in existence just prior to and during the Spanish–American War.  The nation's experience with a large scale mobilization of the state militias would result in new legislation that changed the nation's national defense strategy.  The realization that the system of state funded and organized militia units had failed to provide the nation with a rapidly deployable army at a time when the United States was becoming an international power led to legislative provisions focused upon establishing a more reliable, standardized and federally funded reserve component. These provisions were enshrined in the Militia Act of 1903, which established the National Guard.

Significant state missions
In 1894 the Arkansas State Guard was activated during a railroad strike. The ASG at this time was not funded by the legislature, but the legislature reimbursed the ASG for its expenses during the 1896 General Assembly.

During an outbreak of "Yellow Fever" from August through October 1905 the Arkansas State Guard was activated to enforce a quarantine. The ASG guarded the borders of the state "just as in time of war" and established relief camps.

References

External links
AR National Guard
AR Air National Guard
AR Army National Guard
The Arkansas National Guard Museum
Bibliography of Arkansas Army National Guard History compiled by the United States Army Center of Military History

National Guard (United States)
Military in Arkansas
Military units and formations in Arkansas